Bellegarde-Marsal is a commune in the department of Tarn, southern France. The municipality was established on 1 January 2016 by merger of the former communes of Bellegarde and Marsal.

See also 
Communes of the Tarn department

References 

Communes of Tarn (department)
Populated places established in 2016
2016 establishments in France